Il Borghese is a monthly cultural and political magazine with a right-wing stance published in Rome, Italy. The magazine has been in circulation since 1950 and is named after the conservative Borghese family.

History and profile
Il Borghese was established by Leo Longanesi in 1950. He founded other magazines such as L’Italiano and Omnibus. Il Borghese is published weekly and has a right-wing and conservative stance.

Leo Longanesi and Indro Montanelli were the early co-editors of Il Borghese. The former held the post until his death in 1957. The other early contributors include Giovanni Ansaldo, Giuseppe Prezzolini, Giovanni Spadolini, Mario Tedeschi, Alberto Savinio, Ennio Flaiano, Colette Rosselli, Irene Brin, Goffredo Parise and Mario Missiroli.

In the 1950s the magazine was close to Christian Democracy Party. However, its support ended when Longanesi argued that the party was too weak to counter the "communist threat". Il Borghese was closed down in 2001. It was relaunched in Rome in December 2012.

See also
 List of magazines in Italy

References

External links
 Official website

1950 establishments in Italy
Conservatism in Italy
Conservative magazines
Cultural magazines
Italian-language magazines
Magazines established in 1950
Magazines disestablished in 2001
Magazines established in 2012
Magazines published in Rome
Monthly magazines published in Italy
Political magazines published in Italy
Weekly magazines published in Italy